Banana rat can refer to:
 A species of rodent from the family Capromyidae, indigenous to Cuba
 A rat species of the genus Melomys